Mattias Tedenby (born February 21, 1990) is a Swedish professional ice hockey player who is currently playing for HV71 of the Swedish Hockey League (SHL).

Playing career
Tedenby started his playing career in the Swedish elite league club HV71's youth teams, playing for the under 18 years-team in 2005–06; and both under 18 and under 20 teams in 2006–07 and 2007–08. During the 2007–08 Elitserien season, he was called up HV71's professional team and played in 23 games, scoring six points. During the off-season in 2008, he was contracted for one-year by HV71. After playing in 10 games, including one CHL game, with HV71, Tedenby was loaned to IK Oskarshamn in the second tier league, HockeyAllsvenskan. After 13 games, totalling 11 points, he was recalled to join HV71 again.

Tedenby was drafted in the first round, 24th overall, by the New Jersey Devils in the 2008 NHL Entry Draft. He signed a three-year, entry-level contract with the Devils on May 14, 2010.

Mattias was announced as the last of four nominees for 2009–10 Elitserien Rookie of the Year on March 4, 2010.

Tedenby made his NHL debut on November 10, 2010 at the Prudential Center and recorded an assist on a goal by Jason Arnott in his first game. Soon after, on November 12, Tedenby recorded his first NHL goal on the power play against Devan Dubnyk of the Edmonton Oilers.

On August 14, 2014, HV71 announced that Tedenby had signed a two-year contract as a free agent to return for a second stint.

On May 15, 2019, having completed his contract with HV71, Tedenby left Sweden to continue his European career by joining Swiss club, HC Davos of the National League on a two-year deal. He was released at the end of the 2019–20 season and joined Russian club, HC Vityaz of the Kontinental Hockey League (KHL) for the 2020–21 season on May 2, 2020.

On 17 August 2021, Tedenby joined HC Dinamo Minsk as a free agent on a one-year contract for the 2021–22 season.

Personal life
Tedenby's father, Robert, is a retired ice hockey player who played for Modo Hockey in the 1980s.

Career statistics

Regular season and playoffs

International

Awards and honors

References

External links
 

1990 births
Living people
Albany Devils players
HC Davos players
HC Dinamo Minsk players
HV71 players
IK Oskarshamn players
National Hockey League first-round draft picks
New Jersey Devils draft picks
New Jersey Devils players
People from Vetlanda Municipality
Swedish ice hockey left wingers
Swedish Lutherans
HC Vityaz players
Sportspeople from Jönköping County